Doi Inthanon National Park, nicknamed "the roof of Thailand", is in the Thanon Thong Chai Range, Chom Thong District, Chiang Mai Province, northern Thailand. It includes Doi Inthanon, the country's highest mountain. It contains an area of 301,184 rai ~  in size. It was established on October 2, 1972.

Geography
It includes Karen and Meo Hmong villages of about 4,500 people. Within its borders are a number of waterfalls: Mae Klang Falls, Wachiratan Falls, Siriphum Falls, and Mae Ya Falls. The park has varied climatic and ecologically different sections.

Flora
Flora includes evergreen cloud forest, sphagnum bog, and deciduous dipterocarp forest. There are some relict pines.

Plant communities of Doi Inthanon vary according to elevation. Below is a table of main plants by vegetation type:

Fauna
With 383 avifauna species, it ranks second among Thailand's national parks in number of bird species.

Reptile species in Doi Inthanon National Park include:
Acanthosaura lepidogaster
Gekko gecko
Hemidactylus frenatus
Hemidactylus platyurus
Hemiphyllodactylus chiangmaiensis
Ahaetulla prasina
Hebius khasiensis
Trimeresurus popeiorum
Cyrtodactylus inthanon

Amphibian species in Doi Inthanon National Park include:
Ansonia inthanon
Leptolalax pelodytoides
Megophrys major
Megophrys minor
Amolops marmoratus
Hylarana nigrovittata
Odorrana livida

Gallery

See also
List of national parks of Thailand
List of Protected Areas Regional Offices of Thailand

References

External links

 thaibirding.com on Doi Inthanon
 Betz, H., Srisanga, P., Suksathan, P. (2014). Doi Inthanon National Park, Chiang Mai, Northern Thailand, Selected Plants of Doi Inthanon

Thanon Thong Chai Range
National parks of Thailand
Protected areas established in 1972
Geography of Chiang Mai province
Tourist attractions in Chiang Mai province
1972 establishments in Thailand